Chris Munro is a British sound engineer. He has won two Academy Awards for Best Sound and has been nominated for another two in the same category. He has worked on over 80 films since 1972.

Selected filmography
Munro has won two Academy Awards for Best Sound and has been nominated for another two times:

Won
 Black Hawk Down (2001)
 Gravity (2013)

Nominated
 The Mummy (1999)
 Captain Phillips (2013)

References

External links

Year of birth missing (living people)
Living people
British audio engineers
Best Sound Mixing Academy Award winners
Best Sound BAFTA Award winners